Federico Molinari may refer to:
 Federico Molinari (footballer), Argentine footballer
 Federico Molinari (gymnast), Argentine gymnast